The Nashville Invitational, first played as the Nashville Open, was a PGA Tour event that was held at the former site of the Richland Country Club (established in 1901 as the Nashville Golf & Country Club) in the Woodmont section of Nashville, Tennessee (not to be confused with the current site near Brentwood, Tennessee) from 1944 to 1946.  The par-72 course was redesigned by Donald Ross in the 1930s. The 1945 tournament was Ben Hogan's first PGA Tour victory following his return from service in the United States Army Air Forces during World War II.

Winners

References

Former PGA Tour events
Golf in Tennessee
Sports competitions in Nashville, Tennessee
Recurring sporting events established in 1944
Recurring sporting events disestablished in 1946
1944 establishments in Tennessee
1946 disestablishments in Tennessee